Tabulaephorus punctinervis is a moth of the family Pterophoridae. It is found on the Iberian Peninsula and in France, Italy, as well as on Sardinia, Corsica, Sicily, Cyprus and the Canary Islands. It is also known from Turkey.

The wingspan is 16–19 mm.

The larvae feed on Carlina corymbosa.

References

Moths described in 1885
Pterophorini
Moths of Europe
Moths of Asia